Resistance is the first EP or mini-album (second overall release) by Mika Nakashima, though the title track later appears on her Love album. This mini-album reached #1 on the Oricon charts and charted for six weeks.

"Resistance" was used as the Meiji confectionery CM song, and "Heaven on Earth" (EP Version) was used as Nakashima's first Kanebo Kate CM song.

This EP or mini-album sold nearly all of its 200,000 copies. However, the mini-album was also released in Hong Kong and Korea.

Track listing

Oricon sales charts (Japan)

Mika Nakashima albums
2004 EPs
Japanese-language EPs